USS Donegal was a captured Confederate steamship acquired by the Union Navy from the prize court during the American Civil War. She was put into service  by the Union Navy to patrol navigable waterways of the Confederacy to prevent the South from trading with other countries.

Capture of the vessel, conversion to Union Navy use
Donegal — a large sidewheel steamer, was built in 1860 at Wilmington, Delaware, and used as a Confederate blockade runner, occasionally carrying the name Austin.

Assigned to carry cargo to the South Atlantic Blockade
Donegal stood down the Delaware River after her commissioning for Charleston, South Carolina, with supplies and a large number of officers and men for ships of the South Atlantic Blockading Squadron. She returned to Philadelphia on 16 September, and from 24 September-12 December made four similar voyages.

Rescuing the crew of the sinking McDonough
Later, in 1865, she patrolled the coasts of South Carolina and Georgia until 20 August, when she sailed for New York City, arriving four days later.

End-of-war decommissioning and sale
Donegal was decommissioned on 8 September 1865 and sold on 27 September.

References

Ships built in Wilmington, Delaware
Ships of the Union Navy
Steamships of the United States Navy
American Civil War auxiliary ships of the United States
1860 ships
Stores ships of the United States Navy